The Valkyries is a 1992 novel by Paulo Coelho.

The Valkyries is a spiritual fictional novel written by Paulo Coehlho. It was first published on 1 January, 1988.

Plot summary
The book is written as a third-person narrative describing how Paulo and his wife embark on a 40 day journey through the Mojave Desert. There they meet the valkyries, a group of warrior women who travel on Pegasus. 

At the beginning of the story, "J", Coelho's master in RAM, shows him a copy of the poem by Wilde that says "we destroy what we love" and this theme is central to the story.

References

1992 Brazilian novels
Novels by Paulo Coelho
Brazilian autobiographical novels
Portuguese-language novels